Events from the year 1731 in art.

Events
János Krucsay donates the Krucsay Altar to the Franciscan Church in Nyírbátor
Charles-Joseph Natoire receives his first commission from Philibert Orry.

Works

Jean-Baptiste-Siméon Chardin – The White Tablecloth
William Hogarth – A Harlot's Progress (paintings - lost in fire, 1755)
Giovanni Paolo Panini – Interior of Saint Peter's
Francesco Maria Schiaffino – Crucifix with Angels
Andreas Silbermann – organ of the Saint-Maurice Church in Ebersmunster
Willem Van der Hagen – State Ball in Dublin Castle
Richard Waitt – The Cromartie Fool

Births
 January 1 – Étienne-Pierre-Adrien Gois, French sculptor (died 1823)
 February 10 – Thomas Beckwith, English painter, genealogist and antiquary (died 1786)
 February 16 – Marcello Bacciarelli, Italian painter (died 1818)
 May 18 – José Camarón Bonanat, Spanish painter, mainly active in Valencia (died 1803)
 June 19 – Joaquim Machado de Castro, Portuguese sculptor (died 1822)
 June 20 – Pierre Julien, French sculptor (died 1804)
 July 1 – Johannes Wiedewelt, Danish neoclassical sculptor (died 1802)
 date unknown
 Dirk van der Aa, Dutch painter (died 1809)
 Pierre-Philippe Choffard, French draughtsman and engraver (died 1809)
 Per Floding, Swedish designer and engraver (died 1791)
 John Inigo Richards, English landscape painter (died 1810)
 Paul Sandby, map-maker turned landscape painter in watercolours (died 1809)
 Margareta Christina Giers, Swedish painter (died 1765)

Deaths
February 27 – Francis Bird, English sculptor (born 1667)
March 6 – Johann Melchior Dinglinger, one of Europe's greatest goldsmiths, German artist in a Mannerist tradition into the "Age of Rococo" (born 1664)
March 8 – Ferdinand Brokoff, Bohemian sculptor (born 1688)
April 18 - Giovanna Fratellini, Italian painter of small miniature portraits (born 1666)
June 6 – Giovanni Odazzi, Italian painter and etcher (born 1663)
June 7 – William Aikman, Scottish-born portrait painter (born 1682)
June 20 - Ned Ward, English writer and publican (born 1667)
date unknown
Christopher Elias Heiss, German painter and printmaker (born 1660)
Yedikuleli Seyyid 'Abdullah Efendi, Ottoman calligrapher (born unknown)
Giovanni Camillo Sagrestani, Italian painter of the Baroque era in Florence (born 1660)
probable – Bartolomeo Letterini, Italian painter from Venice (born 1669)

 
Years of the 18th century in art
1730s in art